is a railway station on the Nippō Main Line operated by Kyūshū Railway Company in Ōita City, Ōita Prefecture, Japan.

Lines

Layout 
The station consists of a side platform serving a single elevated track. There is no station building, only a shelter on the platform for waiting passengers and an automatic ticket vending machine. A small shed on the platform that housed a ticket window has now become unstaffed. To the south and southwest of the station are the extensive sidings of the Ōita Branch Vehicle Centre, one of JR Kyushu's major rail depots.

Adjacent stations

History
Japanese National Railways (JNR) opened the station on 22 February 1987 as an additional station on the existing track of the Nippō Main Line. With the privatization of JNR on 1 April 1987, the station came under the control of JR Kyushu.

On 17 March 2018, Maki became a "Smart Support Station". Under this scheme, although the station became unstaffed, passengers can receive assistance via intercom from staff at a central support centre.

Passenger statistics
In fiscal 2016, the station was used by an average of 752 passengers daily (boarding passengers only), and it ranked 196th among the busiest stations of JR Kyushu.

See also
List of railway stations in Japan

References

External links

  

Railway stations in Ōita Prefecture
Railway stations in Japan opened in 1987
Ōita (city)